The men's individual normal hill/10 km Nordic combined competition for the 2018 Winter Olympics in Pyeongchang, South Korea, was held at the Alpensia Ski Jumping Centre and Alpensia Cross-Country Skiing Centre on 14 February 2018.

Summary
The defending champion was Eric Frenzel; the field also included the 2014 silver medalist Akito Watabe and the 2010 champion Jason Lamy-Chappuis, who was coming out of retirement and was not considered a medal contender. Frenzel became the champion again, with Watabe again taking silver, and Lukas Klapfer becoming the bronze medalist.

After the ski jumping, Franz-Josef Rehrl was leading, with Watabe third and Frenzel fifth. By 4 km of the cross-country skiing part, the top five athletes after the ski jumping, Rehrl, Jarl Magnus Riiber, Frenzel, Lukas Klapfer, and Akito Watabe, were skiing together, with a gap of 15 seconds between them and Eero Hirvonen. The gap was growing. By 5 km Rehrl started lagging behind the rest of the leading group, and by 6.5 km was out of the medal contention. Klapfer was leading the field, with Watabe and Frenzel 0.6 and 1.3 seconds behind, respectively. At the finish, Frenzel was the fastest, with Watabe second five seconds behind. Klapfer and Riiber were left behind, and Klapfer won the bronze medal four seconds ahead of Riiber.

Qualification

Using the Olympic Quota Allocation List and Continental Cup Standings, when no athletes remain in the allocation list (which includes results from July 1, 2016 to January 21, 2018), the top 50 athletes were awarded quotas (with
maximum of five per country). Only maximum of four could be entered into this event. The remaining five quotas were given to countries with three athletes to make a team. If a minimum of ten teams were already formed in the first 50, then the remaining five quotas would be allocated using the allocation list or continental cup standings.

Results

Ski jumping
The ski jumping was held at 15:30.

Cross-country
The cross-country part was held at 18:00.

References

Nordic combined at the 2018 Winter Olympics